Brady Wilks is an American photographer, known for his alternative process landscapes.  He works in historical and alternative photographic processes including acrylic gel lift / transfers and wet plate collodion process negatives, ambrotypes, and ferrotype.

Education
Wilks attended Art Institute of Pittsburgh earning a bachelor's, and the Academy of Art University in San Francisco earning a Master's of Fine Arts in Photography.

Career
His work has been shown in galleries in the United States with a current focus on the mid-atlantic coast including Maryland, Washington D.C. and Virginia.  He was juried into the Torpedo Factory Art Center of Alexandria Virginia as an associate artist.

Wilks moved from southern California to the Mid Atlantic coast living outside of  Washington D.C. in Maryland.  He currently works as an artist and educator focusing on alternative and historical photographic processes.

Wilks started teaching alternative process workshops at art centers including Pyramid Atlantic Art Center in Silver Spring, Maryland, and Black Rock Center for the Arts in Germantown, Maryland.  He has devised methods of alternative processes and turned them into a series of how-to articles first published with alternativephotography.com.  Although he uses and teaches many alternative processes, his focus is on Acrylic Gel Lifts and the Wet Plate Collodion Process.

Wilks was a sponsored speaker at the Society for Photographic Education national conference in New Orleans 2015.  He addressed the topic of concept and process with emphasis on getting over the novelty of alternative processes.

Bibliography
Alternative Photographic Processes: Crafting Handmade Images (2015)

Recent select exhibits, awards and publications

2011 – Artomatic of Frederick - Frederick MD 
2011 - Artists' Gallery Small Works Show - Frederick MD 
2011 - Delaplaine Visual Arts Education Center - Frederick MD 
2011 - Photographer's Forum - Finalist Best of Photography 2011
2011 - Photographer's Forum - Published in the Best of Photography 2011 year end book 
2011 - FCCTV Broadcast - The Visual Arts with David Moreland 
2012 - Torpedo Factory Target Gallery New Artists Show - Alexandria VA
2012 - BlackRock Center for the Arts Terrace Gallery - Germantown MD 
2012 - Artists' Gallery Solo Exhibit, Small Windows - Frederick MD 
2012 - The Deplane Visual Arts Center - Solo Exhibit - Frederick MD
2013 - Kiernan Gallery - Methods - Juried Exhibit by Christopher James - Lexington VA
2013 - Artique Underground - Volt Restaurant - Frederick MD
2014 - YourDailyPhotograph.com - Selected as Emerging / Contemporary Artist
2014 - Kieran Gallery - Fact or Fiction - Juried by Melanie Craven - Lexington VA
2014 - Gormley Gallery - Solo Exhibit - Soul of the Land - Baltimore MD
2015 - Potter Gallery - The Hand Magazine Juried Show - Missouri Western State University, St. Joe MO
2015 - UPA Gallery - Guest Artist - St. Petersburgh FL
2015 - Book: Alternative Photographic Processes: Crafting Handmade Images by Brady Wilks published by Focal Press

Notes

External links
 Official site

1980 births
American photographers
Living people
Academy of Art University alumni
21st-century American writers
Writers on photographic techniques